The Ethiopian mylomys (Mylomys rex) is a species of rodent in the family Muridae. It is only found in Ethiopia.

References

Endemic fauna of Ethiopia
Mylomys
Mammals of Ethiopia
Mammals described in 1906
Taxa named by Oldfield Thomas
Taxonomy articles created by Polbot